Coptotriche basipectinella is a moth of the  family Tischeriidae that can be found in South Africa and Harare, Zimbabwe.

The larvae feed on Terminalia sericea. They mine the leaves of their host plant.

References

Tischeriidae
Lepidoptera of South Africa
Lepidoptera of Zimbabwe
Moths of Sub-Saharan Africa
Moths described in 2003